A West Lake Moment is a 2005 psychological romantic drama-comedy film directed by Hong Kong directors Yim Ho and Yang Zi, and starring Chen Kun, Zhou Xun and Linq Yim. Aloys Chen and Zhou Xun had also previously collaborated as lovers in Balzac and the Little Chinese Seamstress and Baober in Love.

Plot

Xiao Yu (Zhou), a barista and cake maker in a teahouse-café by Westlake in Hangzhou. Since a car crash long ago, she had been leading a peaceful life with her kind-hearted best friend and fellow car crash survivor Tong (Yim) who is unabashed in admitting that his feelings for Xiao Yu have developed into love.

One day A Qin (Chen) celebrates his birthday alone in her café. Xiao Yu's curiosity sparks off their dialogues and both discover they have many parallels. But A Qin is a player who is escaping to Hangzhou from the pressures of his relationships in Beijing and Xiao Yu is pursued by Tong ... What will be their choices?

Cast
 Aloys Chen as Qin
 Zhou Xun as Xiao Yu
 Linq Yim as Tong
 Yan Xiang
 Zhang Yue

Crew
 Direction by Yim Ho and Yang Zi
 Storyline by Yim Ho and Zheng Xiao
 Art direction by William Chang
 Cinematography by Pang Hengsheng
 Original soundtrack by Linq Yim and Fernando Martinez

External links
 

2005 films
2005 romantic drama films
Chinese romantic drama films